Loch Restil; is a freshwater loch that lies in the pass between Glen Croe and Glen Kinglas on the Cowal peninsula, Argyll and Bute, West of Scotland.  One of the main roads to the west of Scotland coast, the A83, passes Loch Restil.  The burn that flows from Loch Restil is one of the feeds of Kinglas Water, in Glen Kinglas, which flows under the Butter Bridge.

Loch Restil lies within the Argyll Forest Park which is itself a part of the Loch Lomond and The Trossachs National Park.

References

External links

 British Lakes Info - website
 Sabre-Roads.org.uk: Butter Bridge
 Argyll Forest Park - website
 Loch Lomond and The Trossachs National Park - website

Cowal
Restil
Restil